Hamzehlu (also Romanized as Ḩamzehlū; also known as Khomrehlī and Saqātūtān) is a village in Qanibeyglu Rural District, Zanjanrud District, Zanjan County, Zanjan Province, Iran. At the 2006 census, its population was 29, in 9 families.

References 

Populated places in Zanjan County